Proischnura subfurcata is a species of damselfly in the family Coenagrionidae. It is found in Ethiopia, Kenya, Malawi, Nigeria, South Africa, Tanzania, Uganda, and possibly Burundi. Its natural habitats are subtropical or tropical high-altitude grassland, freshwater marshes, and intermittent freshwater marshes.

References

Coenagrionidae
Insects described in 1876
Taxonomy articles created by Polbot